Emad Mansoor (born April 15 1992) is a Yemeni football striker who currently plays for Bidiyah in Oman.

International career
He made his international debut for Yemen national football team in 2014, during an AFC Asian Cup qualifying match against Malaysia.
He was selected to the Yemeni squad at the 2019 AFC Asian Cup.

International goals
Scores and results list Yemen's goal tally first.

References 

Living people
Yemeni footballers
Yemen international footballers
Yemeni expatriate footballers
Yemeni expatriate sportspeople in Oman
Expatriate footballers in Oman
1992 births
Al-Saqr SC players
Yemeni League players
2019 AFC Asian Cup players

Association football forwards